Neverland is the fictional island in the writings of J. M. Barrie, the home of Peter Pan.

Neverland, Never Land, or Never Never Land may also refer to:

Films and television
Never Never Land (film), a 1980 British film starring Petula Clark
Never Never Land, the secret base of operations in Seven Days
"Neverland" (CSI), an episode from crime show CSI: Crime Scene Investigation
Neverland (film), a 2003 indie film written and directed by Damion Dietz
Neverland (miniseries), a 2011 Syfy Channel prequel to the Peter Pan story
Return to Never Land, a 2002 sequel to the Disney film Peter Pan
Nevrland, a 2019 Austrian film
Neverland, an episode of the American television show NCIS

Music

Albums
Never, Never, Land, a 2003 album by British band UNKLE
Never, Neverland, a 1990 album and a song by Canadian band Annihilator
Never Land (EP), a 2014 EP by Andy Mineo
Neverland (Skold EP), 1996
Neverland (Cosmic Girls EP), 2020
Neverland (Misono album), 2007
Neverland (The Mission album), 1995
Neverland (Night Ranger album), 1997
Neverland (U-KISS album), 2011
Never Never Land (Jane Monheit album), 2000
Never Never Land (Pink Fairies album), 1971, or the title song

Songs
"Neverland" (song), a 2012 song by South Korean rock band F.T. Island
"Never Never Land" (song), a 2008 song by Lyfe Jennings
"Neverland", by symphonic metal project Avantasia
"Neverland", by British rockers Marillion from the 2004 album Marbles
"Neverland", by industrial band Skold from the 1996 album Skold
"Never Land (A Fragment)", by British gothic rock band The Sisters of Mercy from the 1987 album Floodland
"Never Never Land", by Jule Styne from the 1954 musical Peter Pan
"Neverland", by The Knife, from the 2006 album Silent Shout
"Neverland", from Finding Neverland (soundtrack)
"Neverland", from Finding Neverland (musical)
also covered by Zendaya

Other music
Dreamtone & Iris Mavraki's Neverland, a power metal project
Neverland (band), a 1980s Japanese band known for anime theme songs
Fandom name of (G)I-dle

Other
Never Land Books, a series of chapter books set in Never Land
Neverland (audio drama), a 2002 Doctor Who audio play
Neverland (company), a Japanese video game developer
Neverland Ranch, the California property owned by Michael Jackson from 1987 to 2008
Neverland, a fictional Weapon X Marvel Comics death camp for mutants

See also
Finding Neverland (disambiguation)